Susanna and the Elders is a painting by Flemish artist Peter Paul Rubens from 1607. It is housed in the Galleria Borghese in Rome, Italy.
There is another version, a youthful work from 1608, in Real Academia de Bellas Artes de San Fernando, in Madrid.

The painting is based on the story of Susanna, found in a deuterocanonical chapter of the biblical Book of Daniel.

Gallery

See also 

 Susanna and the Elders in art

Notes

1607 paintings
Paintings by Peter Paul Rubens
Paintings in the Borghese Collection
Nude art
Rubens